The Evangelical Church of the Augsburg Confession in Romania is a German-speaking Lutheran church in Romania, mainly based in Transylvania. As a Lutheran church, it adheres to the Augsburg Confession. Its history goes back to the 12th century when the Transylvanian Saxons arrived in the region, then part of the Kingdom of Hungary. 

The church has close ties to, but is distinct from, the Evangelical Lutheran Church of Romania, which is mainly Hungarian-speaking. It also cooperates with the Calvinist Reformed Church in Romania.

History

Beginnings
The history of the Evangelical (Lutheran) Church in the territory of today's Romania finds its beginnings in the mid-16th century, through the humanist cartographer and reformer Johannes Honterus. Martin Luther's writings had been brought and spread in Transylvania as early as 1519, but the real reformation among the German Catholic population took place in 1542 (or 1543) with the publication of Reformationsbüchlein by Honterus in his own printing house in Brașov.

In 1572, the Synod of Mediasch accepted the "Augustan Confession", one of the most important doctrinal documents of Lutheranism (presented in 1530 in Augsburg), as the basis for preaching and church life.

In the semi-independent Principality of Transylvania (under Turkish control), the church enjoyed much religious freedom. However this changed when it came under Habsburg control, with the Catholic Church having privileged status.

20th century 

The Lutheran German minority was highly persecuted during the communist era. The church activities were surveyed by the Securitate, its school system and the diaconal institutions were dismantled. This resulted in an increasing emigration of members. After the 1989 revolution (and the opening of the borders), many Germans left the country, which decimated the number of members in the church.

Churches

References

External links
 Official website 

Lutheranism in Romania
Religious organizations established in the 1570s
Lutheran World Federation members